In genetics, a gametic phase represents the original allelic combinations that a diploid individual inherits from both parents. It is therefore a particular association of alleles at different loci on the same chromosome.  Gametic phase is influenced by genetic linkage.

References

Genetics